"Countdown" is the sixth single by Japanese singer Hyde, and the first single from his third solo album Faith.

It was released on 5 October 2005, and was Hyde's first solo single since 2003. This is the first single co-produced by Hyde and K.A.Z and charted at #1 on the Oricon ranking charts the week it was released.

The B-side to this single is "Evergreen (Dist.)", a rock version of Hyde's very first solo single that was also featured on his first solo album, Roentgen (released March 27, 2002).
Countdown is also featured in Moero! Nekketsu Rhythm Damashii Osu! Tatakae! Ouendan 2, a Nintendo DS game.

Track listing

 "Countdown" (Hyde/Hyde) - 4:07
 "Countdown <US>" (Hyde/Hyde) - 4:10 
 "Evergreen <Dist.>" (Hyde/Hyde) - 4:39

Notes

External links
 https://archive.today/20060405032309/http://www.tofurecords.com/artists.php?artistid=hyde (Official)

2005 singles
Songs written by Hyde (musician)
Oricon Weekly number-one singles
2005 songs
Ki/oon Music singles